Gansevoort/East Steuben Streets Historic District is a national historic district located at Bath in Steuben County, New York. The district contains 22 residences dating from about 1830 to 1908 and designed in a broad range of architectural styles.

It was listed on the National Register of Historic Places in 1983.

References

Historic districts on the National Register of Historic Places in New York (state)
Historic districts in Steuben County, New York
National Register of Historic Places in Steuben County, New York